Hooked: Film Writings, 1985–88 (1989) is the ninth collection of movie reviews by the critic Pauline Kael, covering the period from July 1985 to June 1988. All articles in the book originally appeared in The New Yorker.

She reviews more than 170 films giving rich praise to the work of directors and performers she admires - in this collection for example, Robert Altman; Alan Rudolph - for his film Songwriter; Nick Nolte; Susan Sarandon; Melanie Griffith;  Lesley Ann Warren; Steve Martin in Roxanne.  And she attacks what she regards as second rate, for example, George Lucas, -"George Lucas should believe less in himself - he keeps trying to come up with an original idea, and he can't"; and the film Heartbreak Ridge - "It would take a board of inquiry made up of gods to determine whether this picture is more offensive aesthetically, psychologically, morally, or politically." 

The films she recommends include: 

The Best of Times
Dreamchild
Sweet Dreams
Down and Out in Beverly Hills
Compromising Positions
My Beautiful Laundrette
Mona Lisa
Salvador
Club Paradise
Mike's Murder
Blue Velvet
She's Gotta Have It
Re-Animator
Something Wild
Hour of the Star
The Stepfather
Law of Desire
Raising Arizona
Brazil
Roxanne
Tampopo
Eat the Peach
The Witches of Eastwick
Wish You Were Here
Hamburger Hill
Hope and Glory
Weeds
The Dead
The Lonely Passion of Judith Hearne
Moonstruck
The Unbearable Lightness of Being
High Tide
High Season
Pass the Ammo
Hairspray
Matador
Beetlejuice
Masquerade
A World Apart
Bull Durham

The title refers to her film 'addiction'. "I got hooked on movies at an early age, (around 4 or 5 , when I saw them while sitting on my parents' laps),  and I am still a child before a moving image. Movies seem to me the  most mysteriously great of all art forms."

The book is out-of-print in the United States, but is still published by Marion Boyars Publishers in the United Kingdom.

References

1989 non-fiction books
Books of film criticism
Books about film
Books by Pauline Kael
American non-fiction books
E. P. Dutton books